Jos Museum is a museum in Jos, Nigeria. The museum was established in 1952 by Bernard Fagg.

The museum administers the Museum of Traditional Nigerian Architecture.

History 

The museum was founded in 1952 by Bernard E. B. Fagg, who served as the Director of Antiquities of the colonial administration at the time. It was the first public museum in West Africa.

In 1963, UNESCO established the Regional Training Centre in Jos. The institution was bilingual in English and French until the establishment of a separate French-language centre in Niamey. After UNESCO ended its financial support, the centre lost funding and resources.

The museum has fallen into disrepair, attributed to a lack of government funding, raising concerns about loss of cultural preservation. In 2019, the museum was only allocated ₦158,197,120.

Theft and recovery of artifacts 

On 14 January 1987, the museum was robbed of many valuable artifacts by a group of thieves. A list of the stolen artifacts was made by UNESCO.

In December 1990, one of the stolen artifacts, a fifteenth-century Benin Bronze, was discovered at an auctioneer in Zürich. It was returned to the museum after two independent Swiss citizens suspected and confirmed that it was stolen.

Another stolen artifact, a bronze head from Ifẹ, was discovered in London in 2017. The sculpture had been auctioned off in 2007 by the Belgian government. It was purchased by an antiques dealer, unaware that it was stolen. The buyer attempted to sell the head through the auction house Woolley and Wallis, but auctioneer John Axford realized it was stolen and passed it on to police. This led to a legal battle between the Jos Museum and the buyer over ownership of the artifact. As of 2022, the artifact is currently held by UK police.

References

Museums in Nigeria
Museums established in 1952
Jos
Architecture museums
Archaeological museums
20th-century architecture in Nigeria